The Kokoni is a small domestic dog breed from Greece, only recently established as a standardized breed.  The foundation stock, a general landrace of small dogs of the region, are widely found throughout the country.

Breed recognition
A standardized breed named, the Kokoni has been developed from landrace dogs of Greece, and was formally recognized as a breed by the Greek Kennel Club in 2004. The details below pertain to this breed. They are not yet recognized by the Fédération Cynologique Internationale (the major international breed registry for dogs).

Appearance

This breed of dog is considered to be of a small to medium size, ranging from approximately 4 to 8 kilograms, and with an average height around 29 centimeters.  They have dropped ears, a short snout, and a long body, with a long and curved tail.  This breed comes in a variety of colors and combinations of colors.

Temperament
Kokonis have a loud, strong bark for their size though they do not bark much. The Kokoni is said to have an even temper and gentle disposition, and to be lively, cheerful, amiable and not generally aggressive or timid. Other behavioral claims are that they enjoy company, though may initially be standoffish with strangers. Breeders claim they are intelligent, easily trained, and very devoted to and protective of their keepers. It has been known that the Kokoni breed will often take its time deciding who its "person" will be long term. (may try to run away)

Health
The breed has good longevity and lives into their late teens. Major health issues are not known; given the recent establishment of the breed, this may take time to investigate in any depth.

See also
 Dogs portal
 List of dog breeds

References

External links
 The Kennel Club of Greece's breed standard (in Greek)

Dog breeds originating in Greece